Other Worlds is the third studio album by Taken by Trees, the solo project of Swedish musician Victoria Bergsman. The album was released on 2 October 2012 by Secretly Canadian. The music on the album was inspired by Bergsman's travel to Hawaii.

The song "Dreams" was premiered on NPR's website on 10 July 2012, and a video for the song was released on 25 July. It was subsequently released as a single in digital and 12-inch formats on 7 August. The song "Large" was premiered on Refinery29 on 10 September. The entire Open Worlds album was made available for streaming by The Fader on 24 September.

The video for "Large" premiered on Gorilla vs. Bear on 8 October 2012. On 23 April 2013, "Only You" was released as a two-track digital single, and a video for the song was released two days later.

Track listing

References

2012 albums
Taken by Trees albums
Secretly Canadian albums